Westport Plaza is a , commercial development, resort, and entertainment center located in Maryland Heights, Missouri. Westport was built by a prominent St. Louis developer, Thomas J. White, and opened in 1973. The property was purchased jointly in 2007 by real estate company Golub & Co. and Boston-based Intercontinental Real Estate Corp. In 2012, Westport Plaza was purchased by Lodging Hospitality Management.
The entertainment complex hosts many popular events over the year including the St. Louis Beer and Brat Festival, lunchtime concerts, "Parties at the Plaza" events,  jazz concerts and Archon 34.

Restaurants and Entertainment Venues
 Backstreet Jazz & Blues- Jazz club featuring live music at night.
 Dino's Deli- Deli with subs and salads
 Drunken Fish- Sushi Lounge with live music and karaoke at night.
 Funny Bone- Popular St. Louis comedy club.
 Kobe Steakhouse- Japanese, Teppanyaki-style restaurant provides entertaining dining.
 Trainwreck Saloon- American style restaurant and bar, live music and dancing at night.
 Westport also has fast-food chains of Starbucks and McDonald's

Theatre
 Westport Playhouse is a 240-seat theater with Broadway & off-Broadway shows, Concert Series, Speaker Series, Local Showcases, One-Person Shows, Dance performances, Private Events and Rentals and the a small cafe, snack bar, and gift shop. The Playhouse has a long history starting in the 1970's with many afrtists having performed there over the years including Steppenwolf, Toto, News Kids on the Block, Donny Osmond, David Allan Coe, Cheap Trick, Joan Jett and many others. 
 The Playhouse is now operated by Lotown Media, LLC based in St. Louis, MO and is in the process of re-opening after a 2 year hiatus.

Hotels
 Sheraton Westport Plaza
 Sheraton Lakeside Chalet Resort
 numerous other hotels surround the Westport property.
 Residence Inn Westport Plaza http://www.marriott.com/hotels/travel/stlrw-residence-inn-st-louis-westport-plaza/

Media
 Studios of KTRS (AM)

Government
 Maryland Heights Chamber of Commerce
 Maryland Heights Convention and Visitors Bureau

Transportation
Westport is located on Westport Plaza Dr. with easy connections to Page Ave near the I-270 and Page Ave. interchange in Maryland Heights. Metro operates bus routes in the Westport Plaza area. Future plans to extend the Metrolink lightrail west from Clayton include a station at Westport.

References

External links
Westport Official Site
Map: 

Buildings and structures in St. Louis County, Missouri
Shopping malls in Missouri
Shopping malls established in 1973
Tourist attractions in St. Louis
1973 establishments in Missouri